Yunis Al Astal (born 1956) is a preacher and Hamas member of the Palestinian Legislative Council for the area of Khan Yunis. He writes as a journalist on topics like Islamic law (fiqh), sociology and politics.

Allegiance and views
In 2006 he was identified as a Member of the Al-Qassam Brigades by the Konrad Adenauer Foundation.

On the occasion of Pope Benedict XVI's visit to Jordan and Israel, he said that Arab governments that welcome the Pope harm the Prophet Mohammed more than the pontiff's controversial statements against the founder of Islam.

Advocacy of violence
On April 11, 2008 Al-Astal made an inflammatory sermon in which he advocated the conquest of Rome, which he referred to as the "Crusader Capital", as well as Eastern Europe and the "Two Americas".  He refers to Jews in Israel as "brothers of apes and pigs".

Allah has chosen you for Himself and for His religion, so that you will serve as the engine pulling this nation to the phase of succession, security, and consolidation of power, and even to conquests thorough da'wa and military conquests of the capitals of the entire world. Very soon, Allah willing, Rome will be conquered, just like Constantinople was, as was prophesied by our Prophet Muhammad. Today, Rome is the capital of the Catholics, or the Crusader capital, which has declared its hostility to Islam, and has planted the brothers of apes and pigs in Palestine in order to prevent the reawakening of Islam -- this capital of theirs will be an advanced post for the Islamic conquests, which will spread through Europe in its entirety, and then will turn to the two Americas, and even Eastern Europe. I believe that our children or our grandchildren will inherit our Jihad and our sacrifices, and Allah willing, the commanders of the conquest will come from among them. Today, we instill these good tidings in their souls, and by means of the mosques and the Koran books, and the history of our Prophets, his companions, and the great leaders, we prepare them for the mission of saving humanity from the hellfire on the brink of which they stand.

The Middle East Media Research Institute (MEMRI) translated his sermon and posted the video for paid subscribers on the Internet.
  	
In an Interview by Al-Aqsa TV on May 11, 2011 which was translated by MEMRI TV he said:
  	 	
"The [Jews] are brought in droves to Palestine so that the Palestinians – and the Islamic nation behind them – will have the honor of annihilating the evil of this gang."
   	
"…All the predators, all the birds of prey, all the dangerous reptiles and insects, and all the lethal bacteria are far less dangerous than the Jews."
	
"…In just a few years, all the Zionists and the settlers will realize that their arrival in Palestine was for the purpose of the great massacre, by means of which Allah wants to relieve humanity of their evil."
	
"…When Palestine is liberated and its people return to it, and the entire region, with the grace of Allah, will have turned into the United States of Islam, the land of Palestine will become the capital of the Islamic Caliphate, and all these countries will turn into states within the Caliphate."

Banned from UK
He was named on the list of "Individuals banned from the UK for stirring-up hatred" for "engaging in unacceptable behaviour by seeking to foment, justify or glorify terrorist violence in furtherance of particular beliefs and to provoke others to terrorist acts.

References

 

1956 births
Living people
Members of the 2006 Palestinian Legislative Council

Hamas members
Palestinian politicians